Gabriela Zazueta (born ) is a retired Mexican female volleyball player, playing as a libero. 
She was part of the Mexico women's national volleyball team.

She participated at the 2011 FIVB Volleyball Girls' U18 World Championship, and 2015 Universiade.

References

External links

1994 births
Living people
Mexican women's volleyball players
Place of birth missing (living people)